The Switzerland men's national under 20 ice hockey team is the national under-20 ice hockey team of Switzerland. The team is controlled by the Schweizerischer Eishockeyverband, a member of the International Ice Hockey Federation.

History
Switzerland played its first game in 1977 against the Soviet Union during the 1978 IIHF World U20 Championship. Switzerland lost the game 1–18 and finished last in the tournament and were relegated to the Pool B tournament for the following year. After winning the 1979 Pool B tournament of the 1979 IIHF World U20 Championship they were promoted back to the top Pool A championship. During the 1980 IIHF World U20 Championship Switzerland suffered their worst defeat in international participation after being beaten by Finland 1–19. Switzerland went on to finish last in the tournament and were relegated back to Pool B for the following year. Switzerland continued to move between the top division and the Pool B tournament. During the Pool B tournament of the 1985 IIHF World U20 Championship Switzerland achieved their largest win in international participation when they defeated Austria 20–7. In 1998 Switzerland won their first medal at the World U20 Championships after finishing in third at the 1998 IIHF World U20 Championship by defeating the Czech Republic in the bronze medal game. In 2008 Switzerland finished ninth and were relegated to Division I for the following year. This was the first time in a lower division since competing in the 1995 Pool B tournament. They returned to the top division for 2010 after winning their 2009 Division I Group A tournament. At the 2012 IIHF World U20 Championship being held in Alberta, Canada, Switzerland finished in eight place.

Peter Jaks currently holds the team record for most points with 19.

International competitions

1978 World Junior Ice Hockey Championships. Finish: 8th
1979 World Junior Ice Hockey Championships. Finish: 1st in Pool B (9th overall)
1980 World Junior Ice Hockey Championships. Finish: 8th
1981 World Junior Ice Hockey Championships. Finish: 1st in Pool B (9th overall)
1982 World Junior Ice Hockey Championships. Finish: 8th
1983 World Junior Ice Hockey Championships. Finish: 1st in Pool B (9th overall)
1984 World Junior Ice Hockey Championships. Finish: 8th
1985 World Junior Ice Hockey Championships. Finish: 1st in Pool B (9th overall)
1986 World Junior Ice Hockey Championships. Finish: 7th
1987 World Junior Ice Hockey Championships. Finish: 6th
1988 World Junior Ice Hockey Championships. Finish: 3rd in Pool B (11th overall)
1989 World Junior Ice Hockey Championships. Finish: 2nd in Pool B (10th overall)
1990 World Junior Ice Hockey Championships. Finish: 1st in Pool B (9th overall)
1991 World Junior Ice Hockey Championships. Finish: 7th
1992 World Junior Ice Hockey Championships. Finish: 8th
1993 World Junior Ice Hockey Championships. Finish: 1st in Pool B (9th overall)
1994 World Junior Ice Hockey Championships. Finish: 8th
1995 World Junior Ice Hockey Championships. Finish: 1st in Pool B (9th overall)
1996 World Junior Ice Hockey Championships. Finish: 9th
1997 World Junior Ice Hockey Championships. Finish: 7th
1998 World Junior Ice Hockey Championships. Finish: Won bronze medal
1999 World Junior Ice Hockey Championships. Finish: 9th
2000 World Junior Ice Hockey Championships. Finish: 6th

2001 World Junior Ice Hockey Championships. Finish: 6th
2002 World Junior Ice Hockey Championships. Finish: 4th
2003 World Junior Ice Hockey Championships. Finish: 7th
2004 World Junior Ice Hockey Championships. Finish: 8th
2005 World Junior Ice Hockey Championships. Finish: 8th
2006 World Junior Ice Hockey Championships. Finish: 7th
2007 World Junior Ice Hockey Championships. Finish: 7th
2008 World Junior Ice Hockey Championships. Finish: 9th
2009 World Junior Ice Hockey Championships. Finish: 1st in Division I Group A (11th overall)
2010 World Junior Ice Hockey Championships. Finish: 4th
2011 World Junior Ice Hockey Championships. Finish: 5th
2012 World Junior Ice Hockey Championships. Finish: 8th
2013 World Junior Ice Hockey Championships. Finish: 6th
2014 World Junior Ice Hockey Championships. Finish: 7th
2015 World Junior Ice Hockey Championships. Finish: 9th
2016 World Junior Ice Hockey Championships. Finish: 9th
2017 World Junior Ice Hockey Championships. Finish: 7th
2018 World Junior Ice Hockey Championships. Finish: 8th
2019 World Junior Ice Hockey Championships. Finish: 4th
2020 World Junior Ice Hockey Championships. Finish: 5th
2021 World Junior Ice Hockey Championships. Finish: 9th
2022 World Junior Ice Hockey Championships. Finish: 8th
2023 World Junior Ice Hockey Championships. Finish: 7th

See also
Switzerland men's national ice hockey team
Switzerland women's national ice hockey team
Switzerland women's national under-18 ice hockey team

References

External links
Swiss Ice Hockey 

I
Junior national ice hockey teams